Midland a.k.a. Central Mixe is a Mixe language spoken in Mexico. According to Wichmann (1995), there are two groups of dialects:

NorthJaltepec, Puxmetecán, Atitlán, Matamoros, Cotzocón
South Juquila, Cacalotepec

Ethnologue lists Mixistlán as well, but Wichmann counts that as Tlahuitoltepec Mixe.

A new variety of Midland Mixe has been recently documented in the village of San Juan Bosco Chuxnabá in San Miguel Quetzaltepec municipality, Oaxaca by Carmen Jany and other linguists.

Phonology

The three vowels  resulting in a suprasegmental palatalization then range to three vowel qualities [, ].

References

Mixe–Zoque languages
Languages of Mexico